The Minister for Employability and Training was a member of the Scottish Government. The Minister reported to the Cabinet Secretary for Education and Skills and the Cabinet Secretary for Economy, Jobs and Fair Work, who split overall responsibility for the portfolio, and are members of cabinet. As a Junior Minister the post holder was not a member of the Scottish Government Cabinet. The post was abolished as part of the cabinet reshuffle in June 2018.

History
The post of Minister for Youth and Women's Employment within the Scottish Government was recreated on 21 November 2014, but had existed in the very recent past (until April 2014) under a different title.

The Junior Ministerial post of Minister for Youth Employment was created on 7 December 2011 following the recommendations of the Smith Group. From April 2014, this was promoted to a Cabinet Secretary position, as Cabinet Secretary for Training, Youth and Women's Employment. The November 2014 Cabinet reshuffle saw the Cabinet Secretary position changed to Cabinet Secretary for Fair Work, Skills and Training. In May 2016, Nicola Sturgeon retitled the post to Minister for Employability and Training.

List of office holders

See also
Scottish Parliament
Scottish Government

References

External links 
 Minister for Employability and Training on gov.scot

Employability and Training